Casa Deldra, also known as the Anderson House, is located in Montclair, Essex County, New Jersey, United States. The house was designed by architect A.F. Norris and it was built in 1912.  It was added to the National Register of Historic Places in 1988.

See also
National Register of Historic Places listings in Essex County, New Jersey

References

Houses on the National Register of Historic Places in New Jersey
Houses completed in 1912
Houses in Essex County, New Jersey
Montclair, New Jersey
National Register of Historic Places in Essex County, New Jersey
1912 establishments in New Jersey
New Jersey Register of Historic Places